Samsung Galaxy J5 2017 is an Android-based smartphone produced, released and marketed by Samsung Electronics. It was unveiled and released in July 2017 along with the Samsung Galaxy J3 (2017). It has an advanced 64-bit class system on a chip (SoC) backed by 2 GB or 3 GB Of LPDDR3 RAM. It packs a Non-removable 3000 mAh battery. The Galaxy J5 (2017) is the successor to the Samsung Galaxy J5 (2016).

The Galaxy J5 2017 features a 13 megapixel rear camera with LED flash, f/1.7 aperture, auto-focus and a 13 megapixel front-facing camera with f/1.9 aperture, also equipped with LED flash. The Galaxy J5 (2017) is available at the major carriers following the Galaxy J3.

Specifications

Hardware
The phone is powered by Exynos 7870 Octa, a 1.6 GHz Octa Core processor, Mali-T830 MP1 GPU and 2 GB RAM with 16 GB of internal storage and a 3000mAh battery. Another version of the phone, the Galaxy J5 Pro was released for the Malaysian market with 3GB of RAM and 32GB of internal storage, while the other specifications are the same. There is the option to expand the storage capacity, up to 256 GB with a MicroSD card. The introduction of the fingerprint Sensor and Samsung Pay(selected models) was also a first in the lower mid-range J series of smartphones by Samsung. The Galaxy J5 also sports dual band 802.11 a/b/g/n/ac Wi-Fi network capability, which allows it to connect to both 2.4GHz and 5GHz networks for fast internet access. Also a first in the J5(non prime) series is the metal construction, which gives a premium feel to the phone.

Display

The Samsung Galaxy J5 (2017) has a 720x1280 (16;9 Ratio, 282 PPI Density) SUPER AMOLED Display. with a 5.2 (71.5% screen-to-body ratio) inch screen.

Software
This phone comes with Android 7.0. It supports 4G VoLTE with dual SIM enabled 4G. It also supports Samsung Knox. It is expected along with other phones including the Samsung Galaxy S8, Note 8, A7 (2017), J7 (2017), J3 (2017), S7, S6 and Note 5 to get Android 8.0 Oreo in 2018. As of 2018 August, Android 8.1 Oreo is available in Poland (for the SM-J530F). Android 9 Pie with One UI 1.1 is available as of 2019 September.

See also
 Samsung Galaxy J series
 Samsung Galaxy
 Samsung
 Android (operating system)

References

Galaxy J7
Galaxy J7
Samsung smartphones
Android (operating system) devices
Mobile phones introduced in 2017